The Asia/Oceania Zone was one of the three zones of the regional Davis Cup competition in 1992.

In the Asia/Oceania Zone there were three different tiers, called groups, in which teams competed against each other to advance to the upper tier. Winners in Group III advanced to the Asia/Oceania Zone Group II in 1993. All other teams remained in Group III.

Participating nations

Draw 
 Venue: Isa Town Tennis Courts, Manama, Bahrain
 Date: 20–26 April

  and  promoted to Group II in 1993

Results

Iran vs. Lebanon

Kuwait vs. Syria

Qatar vs. Saudi Arabia

Bahrain vs. Iran

Qatar vs. Syria

Saudi Arabia vs. Kuwait

Bahrain vs. Lebanon

Kuwait vs. Qatar

Saudi Arabia vs. Syria

Bahrain vs. Qatar

Iran vs. Saudi Arabia

Lebanon vs. Syria

Bahrain vs. Syria

Iran vs. Qatar

Kuwait vs. Lebanon

Bahrain vs. Saudi Arabia

Iran vs. Kuwait

Lebanon vs. Qatar

Bahrain vs. Kuwait

Iran vs. Syria

Lebanon vs. Saudi Arabia

References

External links
Davis Cup official website

Davis Cup Asia/Oceania Zone
Asia Oceania Zone Group III